Yevhen Maslennikov (born 27 December 1930) is a retired Soviet football player who played as a midfielder and striker.

Career
Yevhen Maslennikov started his career in 1949 with Veres Rivne, where he played 15 games. On April 20, 1958, 60 years ago, the Veres Kolkhoznik held its first official match in the championship of the teams of masters of class "B" of the USSR championship. The rival was the players of the LTI team (Leningrad Institute of Technology). The score of the match was 0: 0. In 1960 the Avanhard Chernihiv was established in the city of Chernihiv and he was hired by the club where he played 29 games scoring 5 goals and here he also become captain of the club. From 1961 to 1962, he played for Polissya Zhytomyr, where he played 60 matches and scoring 9 goals. On 11 June and on 12 june 1961, he played against Dynamo Khmelnytskyi in Soviet Cup in the 1961 Soviet Cup. From 1963 to 1964, he played for Spartak Ivano-Frankivsk, where he played 59 scoring 9 goals.

References

External links 
Profile on website 

1930 births
Soviet footballers
NK Veres Rivne players
FC Spartak Ivano-Frankivsk players
FC Polissya Zhytomyr players
FC Desna Chernihiv players
FC Desna Chernihiv captains
Living people
Association football midfielders
Association football forwards